Ferguson Bay is a small inlet on the eastern south coast of Southern Thule isle of Morrell.  It is in effect the only safe anchorage on Southern Thule.
It was here that the Argentine Air Force set up the Corbeta Uruguay base, starting an occupation that lasted from November 1976 to June 1982, when British military forces ended the Argentine presence.

See also
Herd Point

References

Bodies of water of South Georgia and the South Sandwich Islands